TV-SAT 2 or TVSAT-2 was a West German communications satellite which was to have been operated by Deutsche Bundespost. It was intended to be used to provide television broadcast services to Europe. It was constructed by Aérospatiale, based on the Spacebus 300 satellite bus, and carried five Ku-band transponders.

Launch 
TV-SAT 2 was launched with Hipparcos satellite by Arianespace using an Ariane 44LP H10 launch vehicle flying from ELA-2 at Centre Spatial Guyanais, Kourou, French Guiana. The launch took place at 23:25:53 UTC on 8 August 1989. It was a Spacebus 300 satellite bus.

Mission 
TV-SAT 2 was placed into a geostationary orbit at a longitude of 19.2° West. It was available on 25 August 1989 to broadcast the Berlin's TV show. It was leased to TeleTV AS and co-located with Intelsat 702 in 1995. In November 1998, TV-Sat 2 was leased to Eutelsat and moved to 12.5° West.

See also 

 1989 in spaceflight

References 

Satellites of Germany